Roy Lee Jefferson (born November 9, 1943) is an American former professional football player who was a wide receiver in the National Football League (NFL) for twelve seasons with the Pittsburgh Steelers, Baltimore Colts, and Washington Redskins.  During 162 regular season games, he had 451 receptions for 7,539 yards and 52 touchdowns.

Early years
Born in Texarkana, Arkansas, Jefferson grew up in southern California and graduated from Compton High School in 1961. He played college football at the University of Utah in Salt Lake City, where he was named the Western Athletic Conference Player of the Year in his senior season in 1964 under head coach Ray Nagel.

Jefferson played on both sides of the ball and also was the placekicker; and led the Utes to 32–6 victory in the Liberty Bowl over favored West Virginia to finish with a 9–2 record. The game was played indoors on natural grass at the convention center in Atlantic City, New Jersey, and featured shortened end zones.

Playing career
Selected in the second round of the 1965 NFL draft, 18th overall, Jefferson spent his first five NFL seasons with the Pittsburgh Steelers (1965–1969).  In 1968, Jefferson led the NFL in receiving yards with 1,074. His 58 receptions and 11 touchdowns were both 2nd highest in the NFL that season. He was named 1st Team All-Pro by Associated Press (AP), the Newspaper Enterprise Association (NEA), New York Daily News and  UPI in 1969. Jefferson finished that season with 67 receptions for 1,079 yards and nine touchdowns and became the first Steelers receiver to post back-to-back 1,000-yard seasons.

Despite being the Steelers' best offensive player, conflicts with head coach Chuck Noll as the team's player representative resulted in a trade to the Baltimore Colts for Willie Richardson and a 1971 fourth-round selection (104th overall–Dwight White) in an exchange of receivers who had fallen out of favor with their old teams on August 20, 1970. With the Colts for only one season, Jefferson helped them reach and win Super Bowl V. He finished the 1970 regular season with 44 receptions for 749 yards and seven touchdowns. He caught a 45-yard touchdown pass from Johnny Unitas in the Colts 17–0 divisional playoff win over the Cincinnati Bengals and had three receptions for 52 yards in the Colts 16–13 victory over the Dallas Cowboys in the Super Bowl.

A contract dispute with the Colts ended with Jefferson being dealt along with ninth-round draft picks in 1973 (218th overall–Rick Galbos) and 1974 (213th overall–traded to Los Angeles Rams for Joe Sweet) to the Washington Redskins for Cotton Speyrer and a 1973 first-rounder (25th overall–traded to San Diego Chargers for Marty Domres) on July 31, 1971. He spent six seasons with the Redskins under head coach George Allen, helping them reach Super Bowl VII in 1972, and retired after the 1976 season.

Jefferson was named to the Pittsburgh Steelers Legends team in 2007, as one of the best 24 Steelers players prior to 1970.

After football
After his retirement from football, Jefferson has remained in the Washington, D.C. area. He had a leading role in the 1976 blaxploitation feature film Brotherhood of Death. In the ensuing years, his endeavors have included owning a chain of barbecue restaurants with the last closing in 1992 and owning a catering business. As of 2006, he was working in the real estate business. He reported that he and his wife, had three children and four  grandchildren.

Personal life
Jefferson is the cousin of tight end Marv Fleming; they were teammates in high school and college, but were on opposing sides during Super Bowl VII. Jefferson left Utah for the NFL in 1965, but returned to school in the off-seasons and completed his bachelor's degree in June 1970.

References

External links

1943 births
Living people
People from Texarkana, Arkansas
American football wide receivers
Utah Utes football players
Pittsburgh Steelers players
Baltimore Colts players
Washington Redskins players
Eastern Conference Pro Bowl players
National Conference Pro Bowl players
National Football League announcers